Double head may refer to:

 Doublehead (1744–1807), one of the most feared warriors of the Cherokees during the Cherokee–American wars
 Double heading, the practice of using two locomotives to pull a train
 Band head#Double head, a spectral band with two heads
 Polycephaly, the condition of having more than one head.